Cricova is a Moldovan town, located  north of Chișinău, the capital of the country. Cricova is famous for its wine cellars, which make it a popular attraction for tourists.

The town's population is 9,878 (as of 2004), of which 7,651 are ethnic Moldavians, 788 Ukrainians, 1,123 Russians, 82 Gagauzians, 74 Bulgarians, 6 Jews, 2 Poles, 29 Gypsies, and 123 other/non-declared.

Cricova lies near the river Ichel, which goes into the Nistru river, which supplies Chișinău with water. The water from Ichel is not used in Cricova. In the northern part of the river is situated a lake (which is near the entrance to the Cricova wine cellars), which was generally used either for fishing or entertainment.

Near the town are some mines, used for limestone extraction, some of them are older than 50 years.

The town of Cricova was first recorded on July 31, 1431, with the name- "Vadul-Pietrei" ("Stone Ford"). Later the name "Cricău" appears in Zamfir Arbore's geographical calendar, over time turning into Cricova.

Twin Towns 

  Noceto, Italy

Gallery

References

External links
"Official Site"
Cricova profile on chisinau.md site 
Description of cellars with photos and an interactive map

Cities and towns in Chișinău Municipality
Cities and towns in Moldova